Marc Jonathan Sievers is the retired U.S. Ambassador to the Sultanate of Oman, where he served from January 7, 2016 to November 30, 2019. His rank, as a career member of the Senior Foreign Service, was Minister-Counselor.

In 2021, Sievers became the inaugural director of the American Jewish Committee office in Abu Dhabi.

Education
BA, history, University of Utah, 1978 
Master of International Affairs Columbia University 1980

Career
Sievers entered the Foreign Service in 1981.  He was the first person to serve as Diplomat-in-Residence at the Washington Institute for Near East Policy (2014–15). Within the State Department, he's served as U.S. deputy chief of mission and chargé d'affaires in Cairo and various posts all over the Middle East including Baghdad, Tel Aviv and Algiers. He was a senior adviser to Iraq's Ministry of Foreign Affairs as part of the Coalition Provisional Authority (CPA) - a position for which he volunteered.

References

External links
Testimony to the Foreign Relations Committee

Ambassadors of the United States to Oman
University of Utah alumni
School of International and Public Affairs, Columbia University alumni
United States Foreign Service personnel
Year of birth missing (living people)
Living people